Frank Howard Nelson Stapp (1908–1993) was a notable New Zealand railway worker and concert impresario. He was born in Nelson, New Zealand in 1908.

References

1908 births
1993 deaths
Burials at Eastern Cemetery, Invercargill
New Zealand railway workers
People from Nelson, New Zealand